It's a Sunshine Day: The Best of the Brady Bunch is a compilation album by American pop group the Brady Bunch released on March 2, 1993 by MCA Records.

Background
The Brady Bunch recorded four albums in the early 1970s on Paramount Records: Merry Christmas from the Brady Bunch, Meet the Brady Bunch, The Kids from the Brady Bunch and The Brady Bunch Phonographic Album. There were also various solo singles and a duet album by Christopher Knight and Maureen McCormick. Barry Williams began work on a solo album, but only six tracks were recorded before the album was cancelled. Along with the Christmas album, It's a Sunshine Day: The Best of the Brady Bunch is one of the only Brady Bunch albums currently in print.

In 1974, Paramount sold its record holdings to ABC (the network on which The Brady Bunch had aired). ABC, in turn, sold their record holdings to MCA in 1979.

Critical reception

"If you have fond memories of watching The Brady Bunch while growing up or if you have all the episodes on tape, there's no escaping it — It's A Sunshine Day: The Best of the Brady Bunch is indispensable" - Stephen Thomas Erlewine for Allmusic.

Track listing

Notes 

1993 compilation albums
The Brady Bunch albums
MCA Records compilation albums